Liang Weilin (1911–2008) was a People's Republic of China politician. He was born in Bobai County, Guangxi. He was CPPCC Committee Chairman of Guangdong Province.

References

1911 births
2008 deaths
People's Republic of China politicians from Guangxi
Chinese Communist Party politicians from Guangxi
Political office-holders in Guangdong